Robert Frost (1874–1963) was an American poet.

Robert Frost may also refer to:
Robert Frost (cricketer) (1793–?), English cricketer
Robert Frost (pioneer), one of the dead in the Fort Parker massacre
Robert I. Frost (born c. 1960), British historian
Robert S. Frost (1942–2013), American composer and music educator
Rob Frost (1950–2007), English Christian evangelist, broadcaster and author
Bob Frost, 2008 Rolex Sports Car Series season

See also

Robert Frost Middle School (disambiguation)